1906 in sports describes the year's events in world sport.

American football
College championship
 College football national championship – Princeton Tigers and Yale Bulldogs (shared)
Events
 31 March — the Intercollegiate Athletic Association of the United States (IAAUS) is established to set rules for amateur sports in the United States, including revisions to American football rules that legalise the forward pass. The IAAUS later became the National Collegiate Athletic Association (NCAA) in 1910.
 5 September — Bradbury Robinson of St. Louis University throws the first legal forward pass to teammate Jack Schneider in a 22–0 victory over Carroll College in Waukesha, Wisconsin.
 25 October — Peggy Parratt of the Massillon Tigers throws the first legal forward pass in professional football to teammate Dan "Bullet" Riley in a 60–0 victory over a combined Benwood-Moundsville team in Massillon, Ohio.
 24 November — the Canton Bulldogs-Massillon Tigers Betting Scandal effectively ends the first era of major professional football. All three of the top three teams in the nation will fall by the wayside by 1907.

Association football
England
 The Football League – Liverpool 51, Preston North End 47, The Wednesday 44, Newcastle United 43, Manchester City 43, Bolton Wanderers 41
 FA Cup final – Everton 1–0 Newcastle United at Crystal Palace, London
Germany
 National Championship – VfB Leipzig 2–1 Pforzheim at Nuremberg
Mexico
 Club Unión founded (8 May).
Portugal
 Sporting Clube de Portugal founded (14 April).
Scotland
 Scottish Football League – Celtic
 Scottish Cup final – Hearts 1–0 Third Lanark at Ibrox Park
Spain
 Deportivo de La Coruna, officially founded in Galicia, on March 2.

Australian rules football
VFL Premiership
 Carlton wins the 10th VFL Premiership – Carlton 15.4 (94) d Fitzroy 6.9 (45) at Melbourne Cricket Ground (MCG)
Events
 The Australasian Football Council is established in November to serve as the top-level governing body for Australian rules football in Australia and New Zealand.

Baseball
World Series
 9–14 October — Chicago White Sox (AL) defeats Chicago Cubs (NL) in the 1906 World Series by 4 games to 2.

Boxing
Events
 23 February — Marvin Hart loses his World Heavyweight Championship to Tommy Burns over 20 rounds in Los Angeles.  Burns holds the title until December 1908 and successfully defends it 11 times until he is defeated by Jack Johnson.
Lineal world champions
 World Heavyweight Championship – Marvin Hart → Tommy Burns
 World Light Heavyweight Championship – vacant
 World Middleweight Championship – Tommy Ryan → vacant
 World Welterweight Championship – Barbados Joe Walcott → Billy "Honey" Mellody
 World Lightweight Championship – Battling Nelson → Joe Gans
 World Featherweight Championship – Abe Attell
 World Bantamweight Championship – Jimmy Walsh

Cricket
Events
 George Hirst of Yorkshire and England creates a unique record as the only player to score 2000 runs and take 200 wickets in the same season: 2385 runs and 208 wickets.
 The Plunket Shield competition is introduced in New Zealand ahead of the 1906–07 season.  The shield is donated by William Plunket, 5th Baron Plunket, the Governor-general of New Zealand. In its early years, until 1920–21 when a league system is started, the competition is decided by a series of challenge matches between five provincial Cricket Association sides, Auckland, Wellington, Canterbury, Otago and, briefly, Hawke's Bay.
England
 County Championship – Kent
 Minor Counties Championship – Staffordshire
 Most runs – Tom Hayward 3518 @ 66.37 (HS 219)
 Most wickets – George Hirst 208 @ 16.50 (BB 7–18)
 Wisden Cricketers of the Year – Jack Crawford, Arthur Fielder, Ernie Hayes, Kenneth Hutchings, Neville Knox
Australia
 Sheffield Shield – New South Wales
 Most runs – Jim Mackay 902 @ 112.75 (HS 203)
 Most wickets – Leonard Garnsey 36 @ 21.44 (BB 6–48)
India
 Bombay Presidency – Hindus shared with Parsees
South Africa
 Currie Cup – Western Province
West Indies
 Inter-Colonial Tournament – Barbados

Cycling
Tour de France
 René Pottier (France) wins the 4th Tour de France

Figure skating
Events
 Inaugural ISU World Championships for women is held at Davos, Switzerland
World Figure Skating Championships
 World Men's Champion – Gilbert Fuchs (Germany)
 World Women's Champion – Madge Syers-Cave (Great Britain)

Golf
Events
 As scoring improves, Alex Smith becomes the first golfer in US Open history to break 300 for 72 holes when he posts 295
Major tournaments
 British Open – James Braid
 US Open – Alex Smith
Other tournaments
 British Amateur – James Robb
 US Amateur – Eben Byers

Horse racing
England
 Grand National – Ascetic's Silver
 1,000 Guineas Stakes – Flair
 2,000 Guineas Stakes – Gorgos
 The Derby – Spearmint
 The Oaks – Keystone II
 St. Leger Stakes – Troutbeck
Australia
 Melbourne Cup – Poseidon
Canada
 King's Plate – Slaughter
Ireland
 Irish Grand National – Brown Bess
 Irish Derby Stakes – Killeagh
USA
 Kentucky Derby – Sir Huon
 Preakness Stakes – Whimsical
 Belmont Stakes – Burgomaster

Ice hockey
Stanley Cup
 February — Ottawa Hockey Club defeats Queen's College of Kingston, Ontario in a Stanley Cup challenge
 March — Ottawa defeats Smiths Falls, Ontario two games to none in another Stanley Cup challenge.
 March — Ottawa and Montreal Wanderers tie for first place in the ECAHA league's regular season with 9–1 records. The two clubs hold a playoff to determine the ECAHA and Stanley Cup champion. The Wanderers win the series for their first Stanley Cup win, defeating the Silver Seven in a two-game total-goals series.
Other events
 3 January — the Eastern Canada Amateur Hockey Association (ECAHA) begins its inaugural season
 Berlin, Ontario defeats the Toronto Argonaut Rowing Club to win the Ontario Hockey Association title.

Motorsport

Rowing
The Boat Race
 7 April — Cambridge wins the 63rd Oxford and Cambridge Boat Race

Rugby league
England
 Championship – Leigh
 Challenge Cup final – Bradford F.C. 5–0 Salford at Headingley Rugby Stadium, Leeds
 Lancashire League Championship – not contested
 Yorkshire League Championship – not contested
 Lancashire County Cup – Wigan 8–0 Leigh (replay following 0–0)
 Yorkshire County Cup – Hunslet 13–3 Halifax
Events
 Rules of rugby league are changed so that the number of players in a team is reduced from 15 to 13, and following tackles the play-the-ball is introduced in place of rucks and mauls.

Speed skating
 January 27 - New world record in speed skating 500m by Rudolf Gundersen (44.8) in Davos
Speed Skating World Championships
 Men's All-round Champion – none declared

Rugby union
Home Nations Championship
 24th Home Nations Championship series is shared by Ireland and Wales

Tennis
Australia
 Australian Men's Singles Championship – Anthony Wilding (NZ) defeats Francis Fisher (NZ) 6–0 6–4 6–4
England
 Wimbledon Men's Singles Championship – Laurence Doherty (GB) defeats Frank Riseley (GB) 6–4 4–6 6–2 6–3
 Wimbledon Women's Singles Championship – Dorothea Douglass Lambert Chambers (GB) defeats May Sutton Bundy (USA) 6–3 9–7
France
 French Men's Singles Championship – Maurice Germot (France) defeats Max Decugis (France): details unknown
 French Women's Singles Championship – Kate Gillou-Fenwick (France) defeats Mac Veagh (France): details unknown
USA
 American Men's Singles Championship – William Clothier (USA) defeats Beals Wright (USA) 6–3 6–0 6–4
 American Women's Singles Championship – Helen Homans (USA) defeats Maud Barger-Wallach (USA) 6–4 6–3
Davis Cup
 1906 International Lawn Tennis Challenge –  5–0  at Warple Road (grass) London, United Kingdom

References

 
Sports by year